Albert Reinold Hunt Jr. (born December 4, 1942) is an American journalist, formerly a columnist for Bloomberg View (from which he retired at the end of 2018), the editorial arm of Bloomberg News (which is a subsidiary of Bloomberg L.P.). Hunt hosted the Sunday morning talk show Political Capital on Bloomberg Television and was also a weekly panelist on CNN's Capital Gang and Evans, Novak, Hunt & Shields.

Personal life
Hunt was born in Charlottesville, Virginia. He graduated from The Haverford School in Haverford, Pennsylvania, in 1960. He attended Wake Forest University, where he earned a bachelor's degree in political science in 1965 and worked for the Old Gold & Black. He first married Margaret O'Toole of Pittsburgh and later married Judy Woodruff of PBS.  Together they have three children, including a son born with spina bifida.

Career
Before graduating from Wake Forest University, Hunt worked for the Philadelphia Bulletin and the Winston-Salem Journal. In 1965, he became a reporter for The Wall Street Journal in New York, before transferring to its Boston bureau in 1967, then to the Washington, D.C., bureau in 1969.

Before joining Bloomberg News in January 2005, Hunt worked for The Wall Street Journal. During his 35 years in its Washington bureau, he was a congressional and national political reporter, a bureau chief and, most recently, executive Washington editor. For 11 years, Hunt wrote the weekly column "Politics & People." He also directed the paper's political polls for 20 years and served as president of the Dow Jones Newspaper Fund and a board member of Ottaway Newspapers Inc., a Dow Jones subsidiary.

In October 2014, Charlie Rose introduced a segment called "Al Hunt on the Story" as a "regular feature interview"; Hunt's first interview under this banner was with Secretary of State John Kerry.

Hunt is a member of Wake Forest University's board of trustees and the board of the Children's Charities in Washington, and has been an advisory board member of the Joan Shorenstein Center on the Press, Politics and Public Policy at Harvard University. He teaches a course on the press and politics at the University of Pennsylvania's Annenberg School of Communications. On June 18, 2008, Hunt was one of 10 people chosen to remember journalist Tim Russert, who had died days before, at his memorial service at Kennedy Center for the Performing Arts.

Appearances
Hunt has also served as a periodic panelist on NBC's Meet the Press and PBS's Washington Week in Review, as well as a political analyst on CBS Morning News and a weekly panelist on CNN's Capital Gang. He was also a panelist on Evans, Novak, Hunt & Shields. He is co-author of a series of books published by the American Enterprise Institute, including The American Elections of 1980, The American Elections of 1982, and The American Elections of 1984. In 1987, he co-authored Elections American Style for the Brookings Institution.

Awards
In 1999, Hunt received the William Allen White Foundation's national citation, one of the highest honors in journalism. In 1995, he and his wife, Judy Woodruff, received the Allen H. Neuharth Award for Excellence in Journalism from the University of South Dakota.  In 1976, Hunt received a Raymond Clapper Award for Washington reporting.

See also

 1980 United States presidential election
 United States elections, 1982
 1984 United States presidential election

Notes
 "1986: A Life-Changing Year", The Washington Post, July 25, 1999

References

External links

Al Hunt Leaves 'WSJ' for Bloomberg, 2004
Interview With Al Hunt, 2005
Al Hunt's Memorial to Tim Russert at the Kennedy Center - video, 2008 at the Huffington Post

American male journalists
Living people
The Wall Street Journal people
Wake Forest University alumni
People from Calvert County, Maryland
Bloomberg L.P. people
Haverford School alumni
1942 births
Journalists from Maryland
Writers from Charlottesville, Virginia
Journalists from Virginia
Harvard Kennedy School people
20th-century American journalists
20th-century American male writers
21st-century American journalists
21st-century American male writers